Ray Pritchard (born 23 June 1954) is an English footballer, who played as a full back in the Football League for Tranmere Rovers.

References

Tranmere Rovers F.C. players
Everton F.C. players
Marine F.C. players
Southport F.C. players
English Football League players
Association football fullbacks
1954 births
Living people
English footballers